Račice-Pístovice is a municipality in Vyškov District in the South Moravian Region of the Czech Republic. It has about 1,238 inhabitants.

Administrative parts
The municipality is made up of villages of Račice and Pístovice.

History
The first written mention about Račice is from 1227 and about Pístovice is from 1375. Račice and Pístovice were merged into one municipality in 1960.

Notable people
Alois Hudec (1908–1997), gymnast, Olympic champion

References

Villages in Vyškov District